Jean-Claude Coullon was a Général d'armée of the French Army and Commandant of the French Foreign Legion.

Military career

As a trooper enfant in 1942, he frequented the military institutions of Billom, Autun, and Prytanée where he prepared his candidate access to the grand military institutions.
He subscribed to an engagement of 8 years at the Special Military Inter-arm School as of October 1, 1950. In reason of the curriculum of the époque, he was detached to the 19th Mounted Chasseurs Battalion at Landau. He was designated as a Caporal-Chef (Senior Corporal) on February 1, 1951.
On the 13, he joined Coetquidan. He was designated as a Sergent (Sergeant) on April 1.

He was nominated to the rank of Sous-lieutenant, on September 1, 1952 and joined the Infantry Application School on October 1.

As soon as he made his sortie, on October 1, 1953, he was assigned to the 3rd company of 20th Mounted Chasseur Battalion at Tübingen at the FFA, in quality as a section (platoon) chief and an elevated platoon ranking chief student.
Designated to Legion reinforcement for Indochina, he joined the DCLE at Sidi bel Abbes, on June 22, 1954, to embark from the camp of Nouvion, on the S/S Jamaique.  Disembarked in Saigon on September 7, the war being finished, the young officers of the Legion reinforcement were spread in various units, and Lieutenant Coullon, promoted since seven days, was assigned to the 13th company of the 4th battalion of the 5th Moroccan Tirailleurs Regiment.
The 4th battalion of the 5th Moroccan Tirailleurs Regiment (IV/5e RTM) became the 2nd battalion of the 9th Moroccan Tiraillieurs Regiment (II/9e RTM) on October 1. He served in quality of section chief and adjoint to the battalion chief.   
Repatriated with his unit to North Africa, he benefitted from a leave at the end of the campaign to count from September 10, 1955. Following the leave, he joined his unit garrisoned at El Hajeb, on November 4, then he followed the unit to Algeria, at Mostaganem, Tebessa and Ras el Ench, as of January 1956. The 2nd battalion of the 9th Moroccan Tirailleurs Regiment was repatriated to metropolis and garrisoned at the camp de Souge in Gironde, on March 11, 1956. 
He assumed command of a company in March 1957. On April 1, 1958, he was assigned to the 4th mounted company of the 2nd Foreign Infantry Regiment 2e REI in North Africa in quality as a platoon chief of AM8, then on August 16, he transferred to the 5th mounted company at Ain Sefra, to assume the functions of second officer in charge. He was cited at the orders of the division and at the orders of the armed forces. 
On April 30, 1959, he succeeded the command of the unit, following the death of Captain Allombert-Maréchal.

He was promoted to the rank of Captain, on January 1, 1960. He was awarded two more citations, one at the order of the armed forces and the chevalier of the Legion of Honour.
On April 1, 1961, he was assigned to Prtyanée Military Institution to command the services company and the 3rd student company. Admitted to the Superior War School in 1965, he wasn't retained at the admittance candidacy and prepared a license in Law by substitution. 
In July 1965, he joined the general staff headquarters of the commander-in-chief of the FFA at Baden Oos, where he successively served in the 3rd and 4th bureau. He was promoted to the rank of Chef de battaillon (Commandant - Major) on July 1, 1967. 
On August 1, 1969, he returned to the French Foreign Legion as commandant in second of the Instruction Group of the Foreign Legion GILE at the corps of the CCS at Corte in Corsica. 
On July 1, 1971, he joined the first regiment at Aubagne for an affectation at the GLE, in quality as a chief of the BPLE, a post which he occupied until May 31, 1973. 
He then joined the Directorate of Military Personnel of the French Army, as section chief of the infantry bureau, then as assistant to the bureau chief. 
He was promoted to the rank of Lieutenant-colonel, on October 1.

Designated to take command of the 13th Demi-Brigade of the Foreign Legion 13e DBLE, he joined the territory of Afars and Issas on August 4, 1976. On the 16, he received the regimental colors of the 13e. He was promoted to the rank of colonel on December 1, 1976. During his commandment time, the TFAI sees the passage to the independence and became the Republic of Djibouti in June 1977. Repatriated on August 20, 1978, at end of tour and a leave affectation of end of deployment to the 53e GDSOM, he joined in November the Superior School of the French Army and the Superior War School at Paris in quality of a group professor. On September 1, 1979, he pursued, in quality as an auditor, the 29th session of the Centre of High Military Studies and remained at the corps of CHEMM as a cadre. During that period, he participated to several study voyages: South America from March 13 to 27 1980, in Turkey and in Yugoslavia from June 11 to 22 1980. Recalled to the cabinet of the minister of defense, on June 9, 1981, as assistant chief to the chief of the military cabinet, he was designated in title for being a government missions chargé to participate from July to August 1982, to the mise en place of the 2nd Foreign Parachute Regiment 2e REP through Operation Épaulard spearheaded by Lieutenant-colonel Bernard Janvier, at Beirut, Lebanon. Mission led in particular by the 2nd Foreign Parachute Regiment 2e REP. He was cited at the orders of the armed forces for his action preponderant in the preparation of the deployment of the Multinational Force in Lebanon FMSB.
He was nominated to the 1st section of officer generals, on September 1, 1982. 
He rejoined the Foreign Legion Groupment and the 31st Brigade, on October 10, to assume command.

Designated to command the French contingent of the Multinational Security Force in Beirut, he toured in Lebanon from May to September 1983 and was awarded an ultimate citation at the orders of the armed forces.

Following, he reassumed command of his commandment post at the Foreign Legion Groupment GLE, relieved in the meantime during his mission by Colonel Forcin.

On July 1, 1984, the GLE became the Commandement de la Légion Étrangère and Général Coullon oversaw the extended prerogatives in exercising the ensemble of applicable attributions of the French Foreign Legion in principal at the title of personnel administration. In addition, Général Jean-Claude Coullon, presided over the patronization and enacting of the 6th Foreign Engineer Regiment 6e REG, which became the 1st Foreign Engineer Regiment 1e REG fifteen years later, on July 1.

On July 1, 1985, he was designated as Director of Personnel of the French Army. 
He was promoted to the rank of Général de division on August 1, 1985, then elevated to the rank and designation of Général de corps d'armée on June 1, 1987. 
Member of the Superior Council of the French Army from 1985 to 1988, which he would be a Legal Council Member when he left the DPMAT to take the functions of Inspector General of the French Army (IGAT), on January 1, 1989, date in which he was elevated to the rank and designation of Général d'armée.

On December 8, 1990, he was admitted to the 2nd section of officer generals.

On May 11, 1991, he was elected as President of the Federation Societies of the Veterans of the Foreign Legion, a post which he left in July 2001, however was nominated as an Honorary President. He was also nominated to the Council Administration of the Musée de l'Armée as Vice-President from 1990 to 1995, and Council President of Perfection of the ESM from 1992 to 1998. Titled of BQMS and of a DT.

Recognitions and honors 

  Grand Officier of the Légion d'honneur, 1989
  Croix de la Valeur militaire (4 palms, 2 stars)
  Medaille d'Outre-Mer (agrafe « Liban » (Lebanon) 
  Médaille commémorative de la campagne d'Indochine
  Médaille commémorative des opérations de sécurité et de maintien de l'ordre en Afrique du Nord (agrafes « Algérie » (Algeria) and « Morocco » (Morocco))
  Commandeur of the National Order of the Cedar (Lebanon)

See also

Major (France)
French Foreign Legion Music Band (MLE)
Pierre Jeanpierre
Jacques Lefort, regimental commander 2nd Foreign Parachute Regiment 2e REP (1958)
Pierre Darmuzai, 2e REP (1960)
Saharan Méharistes Companies (méharistes sahariennes)
Paul Arnaud de Foïard, 2e REP (1965)
Jeannou Lacaze,  2e REP (1967)
Bernard Goupil, 2e REP (1972)
Jean Brette, 2e REP (1974)
Philippe Erulin, 2e REP (1976)
Jean Louis Roué, 2e REP (1978)
Raymond Le Corre
Bruno Dary, 2e REP (1994)
Benoît Puga, 2e REP (1996)
Hervé Charpentier
French Navy
Édouard Guillaud

References

Sources 
 Répertoire des chefs de corps
 Centre de documentation de la Légion étrangère
 Répertoire des citations (BCAAM)

1929 births
Living people
French military personnel